The 1987 Argentine Open, also known as the Buenos Aires Grand Prix, was a Grand Prix tennis tour tournament held on outdoor clay courts in Buenos Aires, Argentina. It was the 19th edition of the tournament and was held from 16 November until 22 November 1987. Second-seeded Guillermo Pérez Roldán won the singles title.

Finals

Singles

 Guillermo Pérez Roldán defeated  Jay Berger 3–2 (Berger retired)
 It was Perez-Roldan's 3rd title of the year and the 3rd of his career.

Doubles

 Tomás Carbonell /  Sergio Casal defeated  Jay Berger /  Horacio de la Peña by Walkover
 It was Carbonell's only title of the year and the 1st of his career. It was Casal's 7th title of the year and the 16th of his career.

References

External links 
 ITF tournament edition details

 
Argentine Open
South American Championships
November 1987 sports events in South America